Bartramiaceae is a family of mosses belonging to the order Bartramiales.

Genera
Genera:

 Anacolia 
 Bartramia 
 Bartramidula 
 Breutelia 
 Conostomum 
 Exodokidium 
 Fleischerobryum 
 Flowersia 
 Glyphocarpa 
 Leiomela 
 Philonotis 
 Philonotula 
 †Plagiopodopsis 
 Plagiopus 
 Quathlamba

References

Bartramiales
Moss families